The 1967 International cricket season was from May 1967 to August 1967.

Season overview

June

India in England

July

Pakistan in England

August

Netherlands vs M.C.C in England

September

1967 Rothmans Cup

References

1967 in cricket